3552 Don Quixote, provisionally designated , is an exceptionally eccentric asteroid, classified as a near-Earth object of the Amor group, Mars-crosser and Jupiter-crosser, as well as a centaur and extinct comet.

Discovery and naming 

The asteroid was discovered on 26 September 1983, by Swiss astronomer Paul Wild at Zimmerwald Observatory near Bern, Switzerland. It was named after the comic knight who is the eponymous hero of Cervantes Spanish novel Don Quixote (1605). The approved naming citation was published by the Minor Planet Center on 2 December 1990.

Orbit and characteristics 

Don Quixote is characterized as a dark D-type asteroid in the Tholen and SMASS taxonomy.

It has a highly inclined comet-like orbit of 31 degrees that leads to frequent perturbations by Jupiter. Don Quixote measures 18.4 kilometres in diameter and has a rotation period of 7.7 hours.

Due to its comet-like orbit and albedo, Don Quixote has been suspected to be an extinct comet. However, infrared observations with the Spitzer Space Telescope at 4.5 μm revealed a faint coma and tail around the object. The cometary activity is inferred by carbon dioxide molecular band emission. In March 2018 a tail was observed at visible wavelengths for the first time. It is still unknown whether the observed activity is persistent or an outburst, resulting from the excavation of sub-surface  ice due to a recent impact of a smaller body.

Notes

References

External links 
 Asteroid Lightcurve Database (LCDB), query form (info )
 Dictionary of Minor Planet Names, Google books
 Asteroids and comets rotation curves, CdR – Observatoire de Genève, Raoul Behrend
 Discovery Circumstances: Numbered Minor Planets (1)-(5000) – Minor Planet Center
 
 

003552
003552
Discoveries by Paul Wild (Swiss astronomer)
Named minor planets
3552 Don Quixote
003552
003552
19830926